"Portrait in the Window" is a single by Canadian country music artist Carroll Baker. Released in 1978, it was the fifth single from her album Sweet Sensation. The song reached number one on the RPM Country Tracks chart in Canada in July 1978.

Chart performance

References

1978 singles
Carroll Baker songs
RPM Country Tracks number-one singles of the year
1978 songs
RCA Records singles
Songs written by Don Grashey